Koradi Thermal Power Station (KTPS) is located at Koradi near Nagpur, Maharashtra. The power plant is one of the four major power plants in Vidarbha – a power surplus region of India. The power station began operations in 1974 and is one of the nine active power stations operated by Maharashtra State Power Generation Company Limited (Prajot), a subsidiary of Government of Maharashtra owned Maharashtra State Electricity Board (MSEB). The plant operates 4 units and has a total power generation capacity of 2190 MW. A proposed 440 kilovolt high power transmission line from Koradi to Bhusawal would join Nagpur with Mumbai. KTPS campus also contains training institute of MahaGenco for middle and senior level engineers, technicians and other staff.

Power station
KTPS is located on the northern side of Nagpur and is spread across an area of 30,337 km2. Coal for KTPS comes from various nearby collieries of Western Coalfields Limited (WCL) located at Silewara, Pipla, Patansavangi, Kamptee, Inder, Walni, Gondegaon and Saoner. The plant approximately requires 16,000 to 17,000 tonnes of coal per day.

The water for KTPS comes from water reservoir of nearby Totaladoh hydroelectric power station. Also, Nagpur Municipal Corporation (NMC) provides treated water from its sewage treatment plant. According to MSEB, the average unit cost of power generation at KTPS is 320paise/kWh at 70 percent load factor while it is 13.52 paise/kWh at 25 percent load factor. The average cost for transmitting this power to Mumbai is 1.26 paise/kWh.

Since its commissioning, KTPS saw expansion in stages. First unit of 115 MW began in 1974. Later, three more units each of 115 MW, were added between 1975 and 1976 while 200 MW unit was added in 1978. The Project Managers for construction of 200/210 MW units were Sri P.S. Khirwadkar followed by Sri C.N.Swamy. Two more units, of 210 MW each, between 1982 and 1983. Major developments were undertaken by Ashok R Agrawal who developed the Power Plant. MSPGCL has further Added  3 units of 660 MW. 660 MW units were inaugurated by Prime minister of India in April 2017.where as Unit no 7 has been discommisson in 2021. As of Jan 2023,the total capacity of KTPS is of generating 2190  MW. L&T is expected to get equity participation by supplying important equipments in the  expansion plan.

In order to reduce air pollution the plant's units are equipped with electrostatic precipitators.

Capacity

Thermal Power Research Center
The Central Power Research Institute (CPRI) of Government of India, which serves as regulating body for testing of instruments and uploading of licenses in India, is going to set up a Thermal Research Centre (TRC) at Koradi. However, the KTPS expansion plans have created a problems in land acquisition for TRC.

Disruptions
On 27 February 2005, a major fire broke out at KTPS and had to be shut down causing blackouts in most districts of Marathawada. In May 2007, the power plant was shut down due a strike by workers.

References

Mahagenco has sought permission from Maharashtra Electricity Regulatory Commission (MERC) to close down unit 5 and 6 of Koradi (200 MW and 210 MW).
Genco wants to shut 1,040MW generation
Ashish Roy | TNN | 4 July 2014

External links
 [https://web.archive.org/web/20091107023059/http://www.mahagenco.in/genstats/koradi.shtm MAHAGENCO Koradi) 
 MahaGenco report giving technical details of Koradi Thermal Power Station

Economy of Nagpur
Science and technology in Nagpur
Coal-fired power stations in Maharashtra
1974 establishments in Maharashtra
Energy infrastructure completed in 1974